Fados  is a 2007 Portuguese film directed by  Carlos Saura. The film, a fusion of cinema, song, dance and instrumental numbers, explores Portugal's most emblematic musical genre, fado, and its spirit of saudade (melancholy).

Under the musical supervision of Carlos do Carmo, Fados completed Saura's musical trilogy form with Flamenco (1995) and Tango (1998). Saura deploys mirrors, back projections, lighting effects, and lush colors to frame each song.

Fados contains homages to  Maria Severa, Alfredo Marceneiro, and Amália Rodrigues, as well as turns by modern stars like Mariza and Camané. Saura expands the songs (which traditionally involve just a singer and a guitarist) with dance and encompasses other nationalities of Portugal's former colonies and idioms (such as hip hop, flamenco and reggae).

Soundtrack
The soundtrack for the film includes several songs that were included in the film:
"Fado da Saudade" - Carlos do Carmo
"Kola San Jon" - Kola San Jon
"Variações em Lá" - Jaime Santos, Ricardo Rocha
"Transparente" - Mariza
"Menina Você que Tem" - Toni Garrido
"Quadras" - Camané
"Fado da Severa" - Catarina Moura
"Rua do Capelão" - Cuca Roseta
"Marceneiro" - SP & Wilson
"Um Homem na Cidade" - Carlos do Carmo 
"Foi na Travessa da Palha" - Lila Downs
"Vida Vivida" - Argentina Santos
"Fado Batido" - Brigada Victor Jara
"Flor Di Nha Esperança" - Lura
"Sopra Demais o Vento" - Camané
"Estranha Forma de Vida" - Caetano Veloso
"Fado Tropical" ("Tropical Fado") - Chico Buarque e Carlos do Carmo 
"Meu Fado Meu" - Mariza and Miguel Poveda
"Casa de Fados" - Maria da Nazaré/ Vicente da Câmara
"Ó Gente da Minha Terra" - Mariza

References

External links
 

2000s Portuguese-language films
Films directed by Carlos Saura
2000s musical films
Portuguese musical films